Frédéric de Courcy, born Frédéric Charlot de Courcy (16 August 1796, Paris – 6 May 1862, Paris) was a French dramatist, poet and chansonnier.

Life 
The son of Augustin Charlot de Courcy and Adélaïde Vallet, in 1826 he became sous-chef of La Poste's personnel department (under Jean-Baptiste Tenant de Latour).

He was the author of several comédies en vaudevilles, often in collaboration, including :
1817: L'Heureuse Moisson, ou le Spéculateur en défaut, one-act comédie en vaudevilles mingled with couplets by Jean-Toussaint Merle, Pierre Carmouche and Frédéric de Courcy, Théâtre de la Porte-Saint-Martin, (September) 
1820: La Cloyère d'huitres, ou les Deux Briquebec, onr-act comédie en vaudevilles by Pierre Carmouche, Frédéric de Courcy and Jean-Toussaint Merle, Théâtre de la Porte-Saint-Martin, (25 January)
1820: La Petite Corisandre, one-act comédie en vaudevilles by Henri Dupin, Frédéric de Courcy and Carmouche, Théâtre de la Porte-Saint-Martin, 11 October)
1822: Le Coq de village, tableau-vaudeville by Charles-Simon Favart avec des changements de Carmouche et Frédéric de Courcy, Théâtre de la Porte-Saint-Martin, (16 July)
1822: La Réconciliation ou la Veille de la Saint-Louis, one-act tableau-vaudeville by Carmouche, Frédéric de Courcy and Ferdinand Laloue, Théâtre de la Porte-Saint-Martin, (23 August) 
1823: Les Deux Aveugles
1824: Ourika ou l'Orpheline africaine, drama in one act and in prose by Frédéric de Courcy and Jean-Toussaint Merle, music by Charles-Guillaume Alexandre, Théâtre de la Porte-Saint-Martin, (3 April) 
1825: In vino veritas, one-act comédie en vaudevilles by Saint-Ange Martin, Frédéric de Courcy and Carmouche, Théâtre de la Porte-Saint-Martin, 24 April
1832: Le Courrier de la malle, one of the first appearances of the famous character Joseph Prudhomme, played by the character's creator Henry Monnier
1835: Les Infortunes de Jovial, huissier chansonnier, voyage en trois actes et 6 tableaux mingled with singing, dances and body catching, by Emmanuel Théaulon and Frédéric de Courcy, Théâtre des Folies-Dramatiques, (22 October)
1836: Les Chansons de Desaugiers by Frédéric de Courcy and Emmanuel Théaulon, Théâtre du Palais-Royal
1837: Crouton, chef d'école, ou le Peintre véritablement artiste, tableau in one act mingled with couplets by Emmanuel Théaulon, Gabriel de Lurieu and Frédéric de Courcy, Théâtre des Variétés, (11 April) 
1851: Le Vol à la roulade 
 Le Voyage à Vienne, etc.

Until his death, he lived with his partner Adélaïde Alexandrine Verteuil. They never married, and had two sons - Alexandre Frédéric, known as an illustrator, and dramatist Charles Henry.

Sources 

 Dictionnaire de biographie française.
 Notice on Généanet

References

External links 
 

19th-century French dramatists and playwrights
French chansonniers
Writers from Paris
1796 births
1862 deaths